The long-snout torrent frog (Odorrana nasica) is a species of frogs in the family Ranidae.

It is found in China, Laos, Thailand, Vietnam, and possibly Myanmar.
Its natural habitats are subtropical or tropical moist lowland forests, subtropical or tropical moist montane forests, and rivers. It is not considered threatened by the IUCN.

References

Odorrana
Amphibians described in 1903
Frogs of China
Amphibians of Laos
Amphibians of Thailand
Amphibians of Vietnam
Taxonomy articles created by Polbot